Montini is an Italian surname. Notable individuals with the name Montini include:

Giovanni Battista Montini, Archbishop of Milan, later known as Pope Paul VI
Luigi Montini, Italian actor
Mattia Montini, Italian footballer

Other uses include:
Montini, a play by Richard Lalor Sheil
Montini Altarpiece, a 16th-century painting by Cima da Conegliano
Montini Catholic High School